Pégairolles-de-l'Escalette (Languedocien: Pegairòlas de l'Escaleta) is a commune in the Hérault department in the Occitanie region in southern France. It is at the foot of the Larzac plateau.

Administration

Population

Sights
 Cave Coopérative
 Arboretum du Mas du Rouquet

See also
Communes of the Hérault department

References

Communes of Hérault